The Moto Guzzi California  is a cruiser motorcycle manufactured and marketed by Moto Guzzi since 1971, with a standard seating position, footboards, heel-and-toe gearshift, and linked (discontinued for the new 1400 models) Brembo brakes.

The first California was designed in consultation with the Los Angeles Police Department Traffic Division to replace the department's Moto Guzzi V7s. It originally had a left-foot gearshift, a bulletproof Lexan windshield and a sprung sidestand, along with the requisite siren, radio, extra police lights, and a standing quarter mile time of under 16 seconds. Later other police departments used them, including the California Highway Patrol. 
 
Moto Guzzi have produced a version of the California almost continuously from 1971 to 2021, offering the last iteration as a 1400 cc model. In 2002, Moto Guzzi made an 80th anniversary special edition California model designed by Italian furniture maker Poltrona Frau.

For 2017, Moto Guzzi released a new bagger model called Moto Guzzi MGX21 Flying Fortress. This model is largely based on the California 1400 (1,380 cc) model with its claimed 95 hp and 89 lb-ft. of torque motor. The frame and associated pieces have been tweaked slightly to accommodate the larger 21-inch front wheel and anticipated load, also real carbon fiber is used for all bodywork.

References

California
Motorcycles introduced in 1971
Motorcycles powered by V engines
Cruiser motorcycles